DACCS may refer to:

Digital cross connect system
Direct air carbon capture and storage